The Ranamok Glass Prize is an annual award given to glass artists who live in Australia or New Zealand. The award was established in 1994 by Andy Plummer and Maureen Cahill in order to promote glass art to the public. Plummer and Cahill announced that 2014 would be the final year of the prize.

History
Andy Plummer, a coal industry executive and glass artist, and Maureen Cahill, a gallerist and glass artist, created the award in order to recognize contemporary glass artists in Australia and New Zealand. The award was originally known as the RFC Glass Prize. The prize is open to artists of any level, and is considered the most prestigious glass award in Australia and New Zealand. An annual showcase of finalists is held, and the winner receives a cash prize and the publicity resulting from a major multi-venue exhibition. The winner is chosen by a board of directors including Plummer and Cahill. Many of the finalists and winners have gone on to gain national and international recognition.

In 2014, Plummer and Cahill announced that they were ending the prize, in part to focus on their own work as glass artists. The winning pieces, collected each year by Ranamok Glass Prize Ltd., will be donated to the National Gallery of Australia.

Award winners

References

External links
Official website

Contemporary art awards
Australian art awards
New Zealand art awards
Awards established in 1994